World Series of Dating is a British comedic speed dating reality television show. Several young men compete to be judged best dater by four young women they date during the show. It airs on BBC Three in 30-minute episodes. It is presented by Rob Riggle, Tom Price and Thaila Zucchi. Bentley Kalu is the referee.

Episodes

External links 

2012 British television series debuts
2012 British television series endings
BBC television comedy
BBC high definition shows
British dating and relationship reality television series
English-language television shows